The neuromedin B receptor (NMBR), now known as BB1   is a G protein-coupled receptor whose endogenous ligand is neuromedin B. In humans, this protein is encoded by the NMBR gene.

Neuromedin B receptor binds neuromedin B, a potent mitogen and growth factor for normal and neoplastic lung and for gastrointestinal epithelial tissue.

References

Further reading

External links
 
 

G protein-coupled receptors